Blountstown High School is a high school located in Blountstown, Florida, the county seat of Calhoun County, Florida. A part of the Calhoun County School District, is a small public school with an average of one hundred (100) students per grade.

Football
Blountstown football team, the Tigers, won state titles in 1973, 1976, and 1977, and were class 1A state runners-up in 2004, 2013,2017, and as well as in 2019 .

References

External links
 Blounstown High School
 BHS Football Official Site

Public high schools in Florida
Education in Calhoun County, Florida
Buildings and structures in Calhoun County, Florida
Blountstown, Florida